Tal Stricker (born May 29, 1979) is a breaststroke swimmer from Israel, who competed for Israel at the 2000 Summer Olympics in Sydney, Australia.

Early life

Stricker was born in Ramat Gan, Israel, and his parents are Rafi and Nava Stricker. He attended Tichon Hadash High School in Tel Aviv.

Swimming career

Competing for Israel at the 2000 Summer Olympics in Sydney, Australia, Stricker swam in three events. He won his preliminary heat in the 100m breaststroke (1:03.99), but did not advance to the semifinals and placed 32nd. He also finished 32nd in the 200m breaststroke (2:19.33). He was a member of Israel's 4 × 100 m Medley Relay Team that finished in 5th place in the preliminary heat (3:43.39), and did not advance; they ended up 17th overall.

Stricker was a member of Israel's 4 × 100 m Medley Relay Team that finished in 8th place (3:43.48) at the European LC Championships 2000 in Helsinki, Finland.

In 2000–01, he was a freshman at Florida State University. He finished 9th in the 100m breaststroke in the 2001 Atlantic Coast Conference (ACC) Championship. As a sophomore, he broke the school record in the 200m breaststroke with a time of 1:59.68.

At the 2017 Maccabiah Games, in the special 4x50m relay race between Israeli and American all-star teams, American Olympic champions Lenny Krayzelburg (four Olympic golds), Jason Lezak (four Olympic golds), and Anthony Ervin (three Olympic golds), with masters swimmer Alex Blavatnik, swam a time of 1:48.23 and defeated Israeli Olympians Stricker, Guy Barnea, Yoav Bruck, and Eran Groumi, who had a time of 1:51.25.

References

External links
 

Florida State University alumni
1979 births
Living people
Israeli Jews
Israeli male swimmers
Olympic swimmers of Israel
Male breaststroke swimmers
Swimmers at the 2000 Summer Olympics
Jewish swimmers
People from Ramat Gan
Maccabiah Games competitors for Israel
Maccabiah Games swimmers